Saint Eoaldus or Eoldus (died around 716) was bishop of Vienne in the very late 7th century and the early 8th century, and is considered a pre-congregational saint in the Catholic church.

Eoaldus is mentioned in the will of the abbot Ephibius in 696, which left lands to the church in Vienne, and in a confirmation of Childebert III in 697.

He was a relation of the Frankish royal family. He was responsible for beginning the construction of a new cathedral in Vienne (replaced in  the 11th century) and for its dedication to Saint Maurice and the Theban Legion.

His feast day is celebrated on 7 July.

References

Further reading
 "Ecclesia Viennensis" in Jean-Barthélemy Hauréau, Gallia christiana, vol. XVI, Paris, 1865, col. 35 (online version)

716 deaths
Year of birth unknown
7th-century births
Bishops of Vienne
Saints from the Carolingian Empire
8th-century Christian saints
Gallo-Roman saints